In number theory, a frugal number is a natural number in a given number base that has more digits than the number of digits in its prime factorization in the given number base (including exponents). For example, in base 10, 125 = 53, 128 = 27, 243 = 35, and 256 = 28 are frugal numbers . The first frugal number which is not a prime power is 1029 = 3 × 73. In base 2, thirty-two is a frugal number, since 32 = 25 is written in base 2 as 100000 = 10101.

The term economical number has been used for a frugal number, but also for a number which is either frugal or equidigital.

Mathematical definition
Let  be a number base, and let  be the number of digits in a natural number  for base . A natural number  has the prime factorisation
 

See also 
Equidigital number
Extravagant number

Notes

References 
 R.G.E. Pinch (1998), Economical Numbers

Base-dependent integer sequences